In the 1994 elections to the State Senate in the U.S. state of Maryland, the Republicans won five of the six electoral districts, thus gaining one seat from the Democrats.

General election

1994 Maryland elections
Maryland Senate elections